João Miguel Coimbra Aurélio (born 17 August 1988) is a Portuguese professional footballer who plays for C.D. Nacional as a right-back or a right midfielder.

He spent the vast majority of his career with Nacional, making 239 competitive appearances over eight seasons. He later represented Vitória de Guimarães and Moreirense, totalling 283 Primeira Liga games.

Club career

Nacional
Born in Beja, Aurélio began his professional career with lower league club S.C. Penalva do Castelo. In the 2008–09 season, he moved straight into the Primeira Liga with Madeira's C.D. Nacional, managing ten league appearances in his first year and scoring in a 2–1 away win against C.F. Os Belenenses on 26 April 2009.

In the following campaign, Aurélio started impressively, netting against Sporting CP in the opener – although he also scored in his own net – and S.C. Olhanense, both 1–1 draws. Additionally, he also started and scored in the UEFA Europa League 4–3 home defeat of FC Zenit Saint Petersburg (eventual 5–4 aggregate win).

Aurélio continued to be an important first-team element in the following six top-division seasons, appearing in 149 matches and scoring in a 3–0 victory at Rio Ave F.C. on 28 September 2013. He also featured regularly as right back.

Vitória Guimarães
On 9 June 2016, Aurélio signed a two-year contract with Vitória SC, where he had played youth football from ages 17 to 19. He played 62 total games for the team from Guimarães, including four in their run to the final of the Taça de Portugal, but was unused in the decisive match that the team lost 2–1 to S.L. Benfica.

Aurélio started in a 1–3 defeat to the same opponent in the Supertaça Cândido de Oliveira on 5 August 2017.

Moreirense
Having turned down the chance to play in Croatia for HNK Hajduk Split, Aurélio moved to Vitória's neighbours Moreirense F.C. on a two-year deal on 20 June 2018. In his third appearance, on 27 August, he scored with the last touch of the game to seal a 1–1 home draw with Belenenses SAD.

Pafos
On 25 August 2020, the 32-year-old Aurélio left Portugal for the first time, signed for a two-year contract at Pafos FC of the Cypriot First Division on a free transfer.

International career
After good performances for Nacional, Aurélio was called up to the Portugal under-21 side by Oceano, for the 2011 UEFA European Championship qualifiers. In the 81st minute of the match against Lithuania, he came on as a substitute for S.L. Benfica's Fábio Coentrão and headed in the final 4–1 three minutes later.

Personal life
Aurélio's twin brother, Luís, was also a footballer and a midfielder. He played most of his career in the lower leagues, and they shared teams at Nacional.

Career statistics

Club

References

External links

1988 births
Living people
People from Beja, Portugal
Portuguese twins
Twin sportspeople
Sportspeople from Beja District
Portuguese footballers
Association football defenders
Association football midfielders
Primeira Liga players
Liga Portugal 2 players
Segunda Divisão players
C.D. Beja players
C.D. Nacional players
Vitória S.C. players
Moreirense F.C. players
Cypriot First Division players
Pafos FC players
Portugal youth international footballers
Portugal under-21 international footballers
Portuguese expatriate footballers
Expatriate footballers in Cyprus
Portuguese expatriate sportspeople in Cyprus